Helmut Ettl (born August 23, 1965 in Linz) is an Austrian economist and European banking and finance specialist.

Early life
Helmut Ettl grew up in Linz and was very active in his youth in the Socialist Youth Austria and in the student movement. Ettl was the school and state school spokesman and co-founder of the Linz cultural center Kapu (a center for independent music and punk music). He completed his studies in economics at the Johannes Kepler University in Linz.

Career 
In 1995 he joined the Oesterreichische Nationalbank in the “Department for the Analysis of Economic Developments Abroad” with a focus on analyzing the economic development of Western Europe. In 2000 he was appointed assistant director and the following year he was appointed deputy head of the banking analysis and auditing department. After stays at the International Monetary Fund in Washington and the EU Commission in Brussels, he graduated from the London School of Economics. In 2003 he was appointed head of the department for bank analysis and auditing. Since 2008 or since the extensions in 2013 and 2017, Ettl has been leading director of the Austrian Financial Market Authority (FMA), since 2011 a member of the “Board of Supervisors” of the European Banking Authority (EBA) and im European Systemic Risk Board (ESRB) and since 2014 member of the Supervisory Board of the Banking Supervision (SSM) of the European Central Bank (ECB).

Ettl referred in a timely manner to the problems with Bitcoin, Brexit, Lehmann Brothers and the budgetary policy of the EU and individual European states.

References

Austrian economists
1965 births
Living people
People from Linz
Johannes Kepler University Linz alumni
Alumni of the London School of Economics